Sumbawa Besar is a town on the Indonesian island of Sumbawa, and is the second-biggest settlement on the island after Bima. It is the administrative capital of the Sumbawa Regency within the province of West Nusa Tenggara, and has a population of 56,337 inhabitants as of the 2010 census and 62,753 at the 2020 Census.

Name 
The slogan of Sumbawa Besar is BESAR, meaning "big" in Indonesian. However, this slogan has also been used an acronym for:

 B: Bersih ("Clean")
 E: Elok ("Beautiful")
 S: Sehat ("Healthy")
 A: Aman ("Safe")
 R: Rapi ("Proper")

Languages 
Indonesian is widely spoken in Sumbawa Besar, with some local languages such as Sumbawa. Several people can also speak Balinese.

Transportation 
Public transportation in Sumbawa Besar may include bemo, dokar (a traditional horse-drawn vehicle), and becak.

There is one airport, Sultan Muhammad Kaharuddin III Airport (formerly Bandar Udara Brangbiji), serving small flights to and from Mataram, Lombok.

The harbour of Sumbawa Besar is of minor importance.

There is no railway on Sumbawa.

Tourism and sights 

Sumbawa Besar has a few historic buildings from the Dutch colonial period.

The former palace of the sultan, the Istana Dalam Loka, was built in 1885 with 99 columns, and without the use of a single nail; well-known Sultan Jalaludin III reigned in the area from 1883-1893. The palace, renovated in the 1980s, is today used for various cultural events.

The largest mosque in Sumbawa Besar, Masjid Agung Nurul Huda, was built beside the palace. The Dutch Reformed Church (Gereja Masehi Injili di Timor) of Sumbawa Besar was founded around 1900, and still holds services. A Balinese Hindu temple, Pura Agung Giri Gnatha, is nearby.

In 1932, the Dutch constructed the Balai Kuning, a tall administration building in a European half-timbered style. The foundation stone from 11 February 1932, with Dutch inscription, is still visible on the northern wall. The building houses various weapons and clothing used by previous sultans, and is surrounded by a park, with two canons dating from colonial times.

Taman Krato is a park with avenues of palms and hibiscus on Jalan Merdeka, the street opposite the Balai Kuning.

The clock tower on the corner of Jalan Kartini and Jalan Sultan Hasanuddin is considered to be the middle of Sumbawa Besar.

Education 

Sumbawa Besar has various public schools and one private Catholic school.

A university was founded in 1998, Universitas Samawa ("UNSA"; "Samawa University"), across the Brang Biji River to the west of the city centre. The study programs include Management Finance and Banking (D3), Mechanical Engineering (D3), Civil Engineering (D3 & S1), Physics, Agronomy, Administration, Economy, Food Science, and Education (S1).

Climate
Sumbawa Besar has a tropical savanna climate (Aw) with moderate to little rainfall from April to November and heavy rainfall from December to March.

Surroundings 

The Batu Bulan Dam was built from 1998–2003 with financial aid from Japan, and is used for the irrigation of 5,576 hectares of land.

Culture

Regional Specialties 
Sumbawa has several regional specialties, these includes: 

Food
 Sepat
 Gecok (Sumbawa)
 Singang
 Pelu lenga
 Rambarang

Cakes
 Manjareal
 Permen jadi
 Putri mandi
 Janda berenang

References 

Lesser Sunda Islands
Populated places in West Nusa Tenggara
Sumbawa
Regency seats of West Nusa Tenggara